PCN Europe (Processing and Control News) is a magazine launched in 2004 for industry professionals. It is published by Thomas Industrial Media BVBA.

Information
Published 6 times a year, PCN Europe is a digest of news on products and technologies available to the European market. In 2009, it had nearly 40,000 subscribers consisting mostly of engineers and purchasing managers. The magazine has an associated newsletter and website with daily news about new products and services.

IEN (Industrial Engineering News) Europe is a similar magazine published by Thomas Industrial Media BVBA. This publication also covers articles on the latest technologies, interviews with market leaders, application stories as well as industry news.

The headquarters of these publications is located in Mechelen, Belgium.

Thomas Industrial Media BVBA is also present in France, Italy, Germany and Turkey. The company publishes as well other industrial publications and websites across Europe.

In English and distributed all across Europe:
Industrial Engineering News Europe (IEN)
Power In Motion (PIM)
In French and distributed in France:
Produits Equipements Industriels (PEI)
In German and distributed in Germany:
Technische Revue (TR)
In Italian and distributed in Italy:
 Industrial Engineering News Italia (IEN Italia)
Manutenzione Tecnica e Management
Il Distributore Industriale
In Turkish and distributed in Turkey:
Endustri Dunyasi

Circulation
PCN Europe has a circulation of 40,000 copies, six times a year.  Subscription is free to industry professionals but it is only available upon request.

References

External links
 PCN Europe's website
 Thomas Industrial Media's website
 Thomas Publishing Co's website

2004 establishments in Belgium
Magazines published in Belgium
Business magazines
Magazines established in 2004
Mass media in Mechelen
Free magazines
Engineering magazines